Sunset Point may refer to:
Sunset Point, Alberta, village in Alberta, Canada
Sunset Point, Arizona, a cliff in Yavapai County, Arizona
Sunset Point, Florida, an unincorporated community in Monroe County, Florida
Sunset Point (Delphi, Indiana), the confluence of Deer Creek and the Wabash River in Carroll County, Indiana (National Register of Historic Places listings in Carroll County, Indiana)
Sunset Point (Eagle River, Wisconsin), an historic estate on Catfish Lake in Eagle River, Wisconsin
Sunset Point (Yarmouth, Maine)